Atlas is a 1961 action-adventure peplum film directed by Roger Corman and starring Michael Forest and Frank Wolff. It was filmed in Greece. Corman's regular screenwriter Charles B. Griffith wanted to title the film Atlas, the Guided Muscle based on the first American intercontinental ballistic missile the SM-65 Atlas.<ref>p.165 McGilligan, Patrick  Charles B. Griffith Interview Backstory 3: Interviews with Screenwriters of the 1960s University of California Press, 12/05/1997</ref>

Plot
The hero Atlas fights against the evil king Praximedes.

Cast
 Michael Forest as  Atlas  
 Barboura Morris as Candia  
 Frank Wolff as Praximedes the Tyrant  
 Walter Maslow as Garnis  
 Andreas Filippides as King Telektos  
 Christos Exarchos as Prince Indros 
 Theodoros Dimitriou as Gen. Gallus  
 Miranda Kounelaki as Arione

Production
With the massive international popularity of Hercules, Roger Corman thought he would make his own entry in the sword and sandal genre with a film shot in Greece instead of Italy.  Corman's original plan was for an epic film in wide screen and colour to be released initially on a roadshow circuit by his Filmgroup organisation instead of Filmgroup's usual black and white double features. Corman used two actors he had made several films with, Michael Forest and Frank Wolff.

Independent producer Vion Papamichelis agreed to put up half the budget, around $40,000. Corman hired Charles Griffith, who was living in Tel Aviv, and gave him four weeks to write the script. Griffith went on to work as production manager, assistant director, writer and extra on the film.

Corman's schemes changed when his Greek partner did not come through with the promised funds, leading Corman to rapidly find new American investors. Corman was also led to believe a donation in the right place would ensure 500 Greek soldiers fully costumed and equipped as extras for his massive army.  Only 50 turned up, leading Corman to rapidly change his original screenplay to use a smaller group of soldiers.

Corman managed to complete his film, shot in ruins around Athens such as the Parthenon with sequences shot at UCLA with Dick Miller and Roger Corman himself as soldiers.  Corman was able to use stock footage from Universal's Sign of the Pagan''. Despite these problems, Corman was able to complete the film for US $108,000 rather than the planned $100,000 budget.

Notes

External links
 
 
 
 

1961 films
1960s fantasy adventure films
American fantasy adventure films
1960s English-language films
Films directed by Roger Corman
Films with screenplays by Charles B. Griffith
Films produced by Roger Corman
Peplum films
Films shot in Greece
Sword and sandal films
Films scored by Ronald Stein
1960s American films
1960s Italian films